For lists of football clubs in the United Kingdom, see:

List of football clubs in England
List of football clubs in Northern Ireland
List of football clubs in Scotland
List of football clubs in Wales

Clubs
Football